Milang is a Siangic or Tani language of Upper Siang district, Arunachal Pradesh, India. It is spoken in the 3 villages of Milang (Milang: Holon), Dalbing, and Pekimodi (Milang: Moobuk Ade), located in Mariyang Subdivision, Upper Siang District, Arunachal Pradesh (Tayeng 1976).

Classification
Milang has traditionally been classified as the most divergent of the Tani languages, hence ultimately Sino-Tibetan. Post & Blench (2011) reclassified it as Siangic, on the basis of clear correspondences with the Koro language in vocabulary that may not ultimately be of Sino-Tibetan origin. The implication is that Milang may, like other Siangic languages, harbour a non-Sino-Tibetan substrate, or may be a non-Sino-Tibetan language with Sino-Tibetan features acquired through prolonged contact, perhaps with the neighbouring and much larger Padam tribe, who speak an Eastern Tani language.

References 

Modi, Milorai (2007). The Millangs. Itanagar: Himalayan Publishers. .
Modi, Yankee. 2017. The Milang Language: Grammar and Texts. Ph.D. dissertation, University of Bern.
Post, Mark W. and Roger Blench (2011). "Siangic: A new language phylum in North East India", 6th International Conference of the North East India Linguistics Society, Tezpur University, Assam, India, Jan 31 – Feb 2.
Tayeng, Aduk (1976). Milang phrase-book. Shillong: The Director of Information and Public Relations, Arunachal Pradesh.

External links 
 ELAR archive of documentation of Milang

Languages of Arunachal Pradesh
Tani languages
Siangic languages
Endangered languages of India